Xiphinema rivesi is a plant pathogenic nematode infecting caneberries and fruit trees.

See also 
 List of apple diseases
 List of apricot diseases
 List of caneberries diseases
 List of peach and nectarine diseases

References

External links 
 Nemaplex, University of California - Xiphinema rivesi

Agricultural pest nematodes
Apple tree diseases
Small fruit diseases
Stone fruit tree diseases
Longidoridae